Pleione may refer to:

Pleione (mythology), a figure in Greek mythology
Pleione (star), a star belonging to the Pleiades star cluster
Pleione (plant), a genus mainly of ground orchids. Prefer to grow on tree-trunks and in rock crevices